Whitman Blount Mayo Jr. (November 15, 1930 – May 22, 2001) was an American actor, best known for his role as Grady Wilson on the 1970s television sitcom Sanford and Son.

Biography

Early years

Whitman Blount Mayo, Jr. was born in New York City. He was raised in Harlem and later Queens. At the age of 17, he moved with his family to Southern California where he attended Fontana High School.

Mayo enlisted in the United States Army, serving from 1951 to 1953 during the Korean War.

Upon discharge, he studied at Chaffey College, Los Angeles City College, and UCLA.

Career

While attending college, Mayo began acting in small parts. He held many jobs to support himself and his family, including waiting tables, working in vineyards and as a probation officer. He also spent seven years as a counselor to delinquent boys.

In the early 1970s, while working for the New Lafayette Theatre, Norman Lear offered Mayo a role as Grady Wilson on Sanford and Son. The character's name was based on Demond Wilson, the actor who played Lamont Sanford and whose real first name is Grady.  During a period where Redd Foxx did not appear on the show due to a contract dispute, Grady moved into the Sanford house and effectively starred in the show for six episodes. Mayo later starred in Grady, an unsuccessful spin-off in which his character moved in with his daughter and her husband in Beverly Hills. After its cancellation in 1976, Mayo's Grady character returned to Sanford and Son. Mayo reprised the role in the unsuccessful 1977 NBC-TV spinoff series Sanford Arms with actor Theodore Wilson, and for two episodes of Sanford, another spinoff of Sanford and Son, this time with Redd Foxx and actor Dennis Burkley, in 1981.

Also in the late 1970s, Mayo appeared on the Los Angeles children's television program That's Cat, offering sage advice in a sweet manner to the main character Alice. In 1990, he appeared in an episode of In the Heat of the Night titled "Hello in There". In 1991, he appeared in an episode of Full House titled "The Volunteer". He played a senior named Eddie Johnson with Alzheimer's. In 1996, Late Night with Conan O'Brien spent several weeks trying to have Mayo appear on the show. Conan even went as far to set up the "Grady Hotline", a 1–800 number where viewers could call in with any Grady "sightings". The show also aired a mock episode of Unsolved Mysteries. On February 8, 1996, Mayo appeared on Late Night to much fanfare. In 1997, he guest-starred in the Nickelodeon sitcom Kenan and Kel, playing Kenan and Kyra's rude, impatient Uncle Raymond.

Mayo also played a role in The Cape as Sweets, the owner of Moonshot Bar and Grill. Mayo made several film appearances, including The Main Event with Barbra Streisand, D.C. Cab, Boyz n the Hood, and Waterproof with Burt Reynolds. Mayo also appeared as Reverend Banyon on the BET TV Movie Boycott in 2001 and in an episode of Martin.  He hosted Liars and Legends on Turner South.  He also made appearances in Sesame Street. Mayo taught drama at Clark Atlanta University. He opened a travel agency in Inglewood, California. Mr. Mayo was a member of Kappa Alpha Psi fraternity.

Personal life and death
Mayo married Melva Washington, the daughter of Clarence and Lena Washington, in Los Angeles in 1956.

He resided in Atlanta's Collier Heights community since 1994 with Gail Mayo, his third wife.

Mayo died of a heart attack on May 22, 2001, at Atlanta's Grady Memorial Hospital. His son Rahn Mayo became a member of the Georgia House of Representatives in 2009.

Filmography

 The Black Klansman (1966) – Alex
 Sanford and Son (1972–77) – Grady Wilson
 Grady (1975–76) – Grady Wilson
 That's Cat (1976) – Grandpa
 Baretta (1976) – Joey Rich
 Sesame Street (1976–1977)
 Sanford Arms (1977) – Grady Wilson
 Starsky and Hutch (1978) – Jeeter
 Vega$ (1978) – Lick Smith
 The Main Event (1979) – Percy
 Diff'rent Strokes (1979) - Jethro Simpson
 Lou Grant (1981) – Fred Jenkins
 Of Mice and Men (1981 made-for-TV movie) – Crooks
 Mr. Merlin (1982, episode "Arivaderci Dink") – Dink
 The Best of Times (1983) – Howling' Joe
 Trapper John, M.D. (1983–1985) – Lewis B. Larkin / D.L. Browne
 Hill Street Blues (1983) 
 D.C. Cab (1983) – Mr. Rhythm
 Hell Town (1985) – One Ball
 In the Heat of the Night (1990) – Winston Tyler
 227 (1986–1990) – Henry Hurley
 Amen (1991) – Swifty
 Boyz n the Hood (1991) – The Old Man
 Full House (1991) – Eddie Johnson
 The Seventh Coin (1993) – Coin Shop Owner
 Martin (1995) – Mr. Mackey
 Family Matters (1995) – Fletcher Thomas
 The Cape (1996) – Sweets (owner of the Moonshot Bar & Grill) / Sweets
 Kenan & Kel (1997) – Uncle Raymond
 ER (1999) – Jesse Morgan
 Waterproof (2000) – Sugar
 Boycott (2001) – Reverend Banyon (final film role)
 Beah: A Black Woman Speaks (2003, documentary) – Himself

References

External links

American male film actors
African-American male actors
Los Angeles City College alumni
Chaffey College alumni
University of California, Los Angeles alumni
Male actors from New York City
20th-century American male actors
American male television actors
1930 births
2001 deaths
Burials in Georgia (U.S. state)
People from Queens, New York
People from Harlem
20th-century African-American people